The first round of the 2004–05 UEFA Cup began on 13 September 2004, which narrowed clubs down to 40 teams in preparation for the group stage.

Seeding

Summary

|}
 Due to a general strike in Israel, the first leg was cancelled by UEFA.

First leg
All times CET

Second leg

All times CET

Grazer AK won 5–1 on aggregate.

Lazio won 6–0 on aggregate.

Beşiktaş won 2–1 on aggregate.

Lille won 4–2 on aggregate.

Heart of Midlothian won 5–3 on aggregate.

Austria Wien won 4–1 on aggregate.

Benfica won 5–0 on aggregate.

Partizan won 3-1 on aggregate.

Parma won 3–2 on aggregate.

Zaragoza won 4–2 on aggregate.

Sporting CP won 2–0 on aggregate.

Newcastle United won 7–1 on aggregate.

Steaua București won 4-3 on aggregate.

Wisła Kraków 5-5 Dinamo Tbilisi on aggregate. Dinamo Tbilisi won on away goals.

Utrecht won 4-3 on aggregate.

Ferencváros won 4-2 on aggregate.

Schalke 04 won 9-1 on aggregate.

Dnipro Dnipropetrovsk won 2-1 on aggregate.

Basel won 3-1 on aggregate.

Feyenoord won 5-1 on aggregate.

Auxerre won 3-1 on aggregate.

Sevilla won 4-1 on aggregate.

AEK Athens won 2-1 on aggregate.

Standard Liège 1-1 Bochum on aggregate. Standard Liège won on away goals.

Zenit Saint Petersburg won 6-1 on aggregate.

Athletic Bilbao won 4-3 on aggregate.

Stuttgart won 7-1 on aggregate.

Panionios won 3-2 on aggregate.

Heerenveen won 5-0 on aggregate.

Beveren won 2-1 on aggregate.

Dinamo Zagreb won 2-0 on aggregate.

Alemannia Aachen won 5-1 on aggregate.

Middlesbrough won 4-1 on aggregate.

Club Brugge won 6-1 on aggregate.

AZ won 5-3 on aggregate.

Amica Wronki won 2-1 on aggregate.

Sochaux won 9-0 on aggregate.

Egaleo won 2-1 on aggregate.

Marítimo 1-1 Rangers on aggregate. Rangers won 4-2 on penalties.

Villarreal won 5-1 on aggregate.

Notes

References

External links
First Round Information UEFA.com
Seeding Information 

2004–05 UEFA Cup
September 2004 sports events in Europe
UEFA Cup qualifying rounds